Hudson Dias de Jesus (born 11 January 1991) is a Brazilian footballer who plays as a forward for Malaysia Premier League side Kuching City F.C.

References

External links
 

1991 births
Living people
Brazilian footballers
Brazilian expatriate footballers
Association football forwards
Expatriate footballers in Malaysia
Sarawak FA players
Kuching City F.C. players
Malaysia Premier League players